Enrico Del Prato (born 10 November 1999) is an Italian footballer who plays as a defender or defensive midfielder for  club Parma.

Club career

Atalanta
Del Prato is a product of Atalanta youth teams and started playing for their Under-19 squad in the 2016–17 season.

In the 2017–18 Serie A and 2018–19 Serie A seasons, he was called up to the senior squad on several occasions (including the 2019 Coppa Italia Final), but remained on the bench every time.

Loan to Livorno
On 13 July 2019, he was loaned to Serie B club Livorno.

He made his professional Serie B debut for Livorno on 24 August 2019 in a game against Virtus Entella, substituting Andrea Luci in the 74th minute. He first appeared in the starting lineup and played his first full game on 24 September 2019 against Cosenza.

Loan to Reggina
On 11 September 2020, he joined Serie B club Reggina on loan.

Parma
On 31 August 2021, after remaining with Atalanta for the entirety of the preseason, Del Prato joined Serie B club Parma on a one-year loan. Del Prato transferred to Parma on a permanent deal on 21 June 2022.

International career
He was first called up to represent his country in November 2016 with the Under-18 squad.

He was selected for Italy's squad at the 2018 UEFA European Under-19 Championship, but did not make any appearances as Italy finished as runners-up.

At the 2019 FIFA U-20 World Cup, he started every game, except for the group stage game against Japan, as Italy finished in 4th place.

On 6 September 2019 he made his debut for Italy U21 in a friendly against Moldova.

References

External links
 

1999 births
Footballers from Bergamo
Living people
Italian footballers
Italy youth international footballers
Italy under-21 international footballers
Association football midfielders
Atalanta B.C. players
U.S. Livorno 1915 players
Reggina 1914 players
Parma Calcio 1913 players
Serie B players